Shanhe is a town under the administration of Zezhou County, Shanxi, China. , it has 52 villages under its administration.

References 

Township-level divisions of Shanxi
Zezhou County